Nannotrigona is a genus of bees belonging to the family Apidae.

The species of this genus are found in Central and Southern America.

Species:

Nannotrigona camargoi 
Nannotrigona chapadana 
Nannotrigona dutrae 
Nannotrigona gaboi 
Nannotrigona melanocera 
Nannotrigona mellaria 
Nannotrigona minuta 
Nannotrigona occidentalis 
Nannotrigona perilampoides 
Nannotrigona pilosa 
Nannotrigona punctata 
Nannotrigona schultzei 
Nannotrigona testaceicornis 
Nannotrigona tristella

References

Meliponini